Domenico Bennardi (born 14 July 1975 in Fasano) is an Italian politician.

He ran for Mayor of Matera with the Five Star Movement at the 2020 local elections and was elected at the second round on 5 October. He took office on 6 October 2020.

See also
2020 Italian local elections
List of mayors of Matera

References

External links
 

1975 births
Living people
Mayors of Matera
Five Star Movement politicians